Tin Liu may refer to several places in Hong Kong, including:
 Tin Liu, Ma Wan, a village on Ma Wan island
 Tin Liu aka. Tai Tung Wo Liu, a village in Sai Kung North, Tai Po District
 Tin Liu Tsuen, a walled village in Shap Pat Heung, Yuen Long District